Bussea xylocarpa is a species of legume in the family Fabaceae.
It is found only in Mozambique.
It is threatened by habitat loss.

References

Caesalpinioideae
Endemic flora of Mozambique
Vulnerable flora of Africa
Taxonomy articles created by Polbot